The 2002 Spanish Grand Prix (formally the XLIV Gran Premio Marlboro de España) was a Formula One motor race held on 28 April 2002 at the Circuit de Catalunya, Montmeló, Catalonia, Spain. It was the fifth round of the 2002 Formula One season and the forty-fourth Spanish Grand Prix. The 65-lap race was won by Michael Schumacher driving a Ferrari car after starting from pole position. Juan Pablo Montoya finished second driving for the Williams team, with David Coulthard third driving for McLaren.

As a consequence of the race, Schumacher extended his lead over Montoya who took over second position in the Drivers' Championship from his team-mate Ralf Schumacher to 21 points. In the Constructors Championship, Ferrari extended their lead over Williams to seven points.

Background
Heading into the fifth race of the season, Ferrari driver Michael Schumacher was leading the Drivers' Championship with 34 points; ahead of Williams driver and brother Ralf Schumacher on 20, and Juan Pablo Montoya on 17. Renault driver Jenson Button was fourth with 8 points and Rubens Barrichello on 6. The Constructors' Championship was closer at the front with Ferrari on 40 points leading Williams who were on 37.

Practice and qualifying
Four practice sessions were held before the Sunday race, two each on Friday and Saturday. The Friday morning and afternoon sessions each lasted an hour; the third and fourth sessions, on Saturday morning, lasted 45 minutes each.

Saturday's afternoon qualifying session lasted for an hour. Each driver was limited to twelve laps, with the grid order decided by the drivers' fastest laps. During this session, the 107% rule was in effect, which necessitated each driver set a time within 107% of the quickest lap to qualify for the race.

The Minardi of Mark Webber sustained a rear wing failure on the main straight after he completed his 12th lap and the red flag was brought out afterwards.

Qualifying classification

 - Eddie Irvine was demoted to last place because of a fuel analysis which showed that the fuel was not the same as one of those approved for use by Jaguar prior to the event.

Race
The Stewards of the Meeting received a notice from KL Minardi Asiatech, informing them of their intention to withdraw from the 2002 Spanish Grand Prix due to a number of front and rear wing failures they suffered over the weekend. Having spoken to the Team Manager, the Stewards of the Meeting decided to accept the withdrawal of KL Minardi Asiatech from the event. During the race, Juan Pablo Montoya made his planned stop, with chief mechanic and lollipop man Carl Gaden signalling for Montoya to go, only to belatedly realise that the Williams was still being refuelled. Montoya reacted quickly having initially gone to launch away, only to stop right on Gaden's foot as the rest of the pitcrew were bowled over. This would re-occur in the 2004 race. Michael Schumacher achieved his third Grand Chelem at this race, and his first since 1994.

Race classification

Championship standings after the race 

Drivers' Championship standings

Constructors' Championship standings

Note: Only the top five positions are included for both sets of standings.

References

Spanish Grand Prix
Spanish Grand Prix
Grand Prix
April 2002 sports events in Europe